The 2019–20 season was Kirolbet Baskonia's 61st in existence and the club's 38th consecutive season in the top flight of Spanish basketball and the 20th consecutive season in the EuroLeague. It was the second consecutive season under head coach Velimir Perasović, who signed in November 2018 and was replaced with Duško Ivanović in December 2019.

Times up to 26 October 2019 and from 29 March 2020 were CEST (UTC+2). Times from 27 October 2019 to 28 March 2020 were CET (UTC+1).

Players

Squad information

Transactions

In

|}

Out

|}

Pre-season and friendlies

Friendly matches

Torneo Liberbank Ciudad de Oviedo

Euskal Kopa

Trofeo Araba/Álava Saria

Competitions

Overview

Liga ACB

League table

Results summary

Results by round

Matches

Playoffs

Group stage

Semifinals

Final

EuroLeague

League table

Results summary

Results by round

Matches

Statistics

Liga ACB

Source: ACB

EuroLeague

Source: EuroLeague

Notes

References

External links
 

 
Baskonia
Baskonia